The 2003 Dubai World Cup was a horse race held at Nad Al Sheba Racecourse on Saturday 29 March 2003. It was the 8th running of the Dubai World Cup.

The winner was Godolphin's Moon Ballad, a four-year-old chestnut horse trained in Dubai by Saeed bin Suroor and ridden by Frankie Dettori. Moon Ballad's's victory was the second in the race for Dettori, the fourth for bin Suroor and the third for Godolphin.

Moon Ballad was originally trained in England by David Loder before being transferred to Saeed bin Suroor's stable in 2002. As a three-year-old he won the Dante Stakes and the Select Stakes as well as finishing third in the Epsom Derby and second in the Champion Stakes. He prepared for the World Cup by winning the second round of the Al Maktoum Challenge in February. In the 2003 Dubai World Cup he started the 11/4 second favourite and won by five lengths from the American challenger Harlan's Holiday with the 11/8 favourite Nayef a length away in third place.

Race details
 Sponsor: none
 Purse: £3,750,000; First prize: £2,250,000
 Surface: Dirt
 Going: Fast
 Distance: 10 furlongs
 Number of runners: 11
 Winner's time: 2:00.48

Full result

 Abbreviations: DSQ = disqualified; nse = nose; nk = neck; shd = head; hd = head; nk = neck

Winner's details
Further details of the winner, Moon Ballad
 Sex: Stallion
 Foaled: 4 March 1999
 Country: Ireland
 Sire: Singspiel; Dam: Velvet Moon (Shaadi)
 Owner: Godolphin
 Breeder: Newgate Stud

References

Dubai World Cup
Dubai World Cup
Dubai World Cup
Dubai World Cup